Operation Albumen was the name given to British Commando raids in June 1942 on German airfields in the Axis-occupied Greek island of Crete, to prevent them from being used in support of the Afrika Korps in the Western Desert Campaign in the Second World War. These operations were carried out in tandem with similar raids against Axis airfields at Benghazi, Derna and Barce in Libya and were among the first planned sabotage acts in occupied Europe.

Overview 
During the late spring of 1942, the airfields of Crete gained increased strategic importance by becoming the main transit base for Luftwaffe to supply logistic support to Rommel's Afrika Korps in their advance on the Nile Delta. Furthermore, Luftwaffe aircraft based on Crete operated photo-reconnaissance, bombing and convoy attack missions covering the south-east Mediterranean region. Aiming to disrupt these operations, British generals in Cairo sent three groups from the Special Boat Squadron (SBS) and one from Stirling's Special Air Service (SAS) to Crete to sabotage the airfields of Heraklion, Kastelli, Tympaki and Maleme.

Aircraft types operating from Crete at the time included the Ju 52 and Me 323 for transport, the Ju 88 and Ju 86 for bombing and photo-reconnaissance and the Bf 109 as a fighter.

Heraklion airfield was allocated to the SAS group and the SBS groups were assigned to the other three airfields. The SBS groups were met by Tom Dunbabin, the British liaison officer with the Cretan resistance, who provided them with local guides. The date for all sabotage attacks was scheduled for the night of 7/8 June 1942

The Raids

Kastelli operation 

The squad detailed to attack Kastelli consisted of Captain G.I.A. Duncan of the Black Watch, two NCOs of the SBS and the Greek gendarme Vassilis Dramoundanis. The operation unfolded according to plan and on 7 June the saboteurs, assisted by the locals Giorgos Psarakis, Kimonas Zografakis (nicknamed Blackman) and Kostas Mavrantonakis, managed to destroy 5 aircraft, damage 29 other and set fire to several vehicles and considerable quantities of supplies (including about 200 tons of aviation fuel) using delayed-action bombs.

The June 1942 operation is often referred to as the first raid on Kastelli to differentiate it from a similar operation that took place a year later. One of the objectives of this second operation was to lead the Germans into believing that an Allied landing on Crete (rather than their true target Sicily) was imminent. Thus, on the night of 4/5 July 1943, two commando groups under the Danish Major Anders Lassen and the Greek Kimonas Zografakis, simultaneously attacked the airfield of Kastelli from two different locations. Despite the strong security, they succeeded in deceiving the garrison and destroyed most of the parked aircraft and fuel dumps.

Heraklion operation 

The Heraklion operation was commanded by George Jellicoe and included four members of the Free French Forces under Georges Bergé (the other three being Jacques Mouhot, Pierre Léostic, and Jack Sibard), and Lieutenant Kostis Petrakis of the Hellenic Army. The group was transferred to Crete on board the Greek submarine Triton, and rowed ashore in three inflatable boats. They had intended to land at Karteros beach, but came ashore in the Gulf of Malia on the dawn of 10 June and behind schedule. Owing to landing at the wrong location, the men had to march overland to reach Heraklion airfield. They hid by day, and marched throughout the nights, finally arriving during the night of 12/13 June. Due to increased traffic caused by a succession of night sorties that was in progress, the team had to postpone their attack until the next evening. The group entered the airfield while it was being bombed by the RAF, and destroyed about 20 Ju 88s using Lewes bombs. All six saboteurs escaped from the airfield, but their retreat was betrayed, resulting in 17-year-old Pierre Léostic being killed and the other three Frenchmen being arrested. Jellicoe and Petrakis escaped to Egypt.

Tympaki operation 
The Tympaki team (led by David Sutherland of the Black Watch) discovered that due to air raids from Egypt, the airfield had been temporarily abandoned and the aircraft based there had been relocated.

Maleme operation 
The Maleme team was made up of Captains Michael Kealy and James Allott who landed on Crete aboard the Greek submarine Papanikolis. After a difficult march, they reached Maleme but were also unsuccessful. They discovered that the airfield was strongly guarded and was recently equipped with electrified fences, making it impossible to penetrate its perimeter.

Aftermath 
As a result of the raids, 25 aircraft were completely destroyed, many more damaged, and 12 German soldiers killed. In reprisal for the sabotage in Heraklion, the occupation forces executed 50 inhabitants of the greater Heraklion area the next day. Prior to the attacks, on 3 June, the Germans had executed another 12 Heraklion citizens. The Avenue of the 62 Martyrs in modern Heraklion is named in remembrance of the victims.

On 23 June, Jellicoe, Petrakis and the participants of the Kastelli and Tympaki operations were evacuated to Mersa Matruh, Egypt on a caique from Trypiti beach near the village of Krotos in south Crete. They reached Mersa Matruh shortly before it fell to Rommel's advancing forces. Jellicoe was later awarded the Distinguished Service Order. After several days of interrogations under the threat of execution, Bergé, Mouhot and Sibard, who were captured after the Heraklion sabotage, were transferred to the Oflag X-C war prisoner camp in Germany. Eventually, Bergé ended up in Colditz castle in Saxony where prisoners who had repeatedly attempted to escape were held. There, Bergé joined SAS commander David Stirling who had been captured in the meantime. To honor the memory of Pierre Léostic, Kostis Petrakis christened his son after him.

The failure to prevent the raids on the airfields was one of the reasons that led to the replacement of General Alexander Andrae by Bruno Bräuer as commander of Crete.

See also 
 Greek Resistance
 Cretan Resistance

References

Further reading

External links 
 Earl Jellicoe interviewed, also describes Heraklion operation
 Heraklion operation from France Libre (in French -- translate)
 Obituary: General Georges Berge
 Sabotage /62: Historical Museum of Crete (in Greek -- translate)

Conflicts in 1942
Acts of sabotage
Crete in World War II
Battles and operations involving the Greek Resistance
Mediterranean theatre of World War II
Special Air Service operations
1942 in Greece
World War II British Commando raids
World War II sabotage
Mass murder in 1942